Silhua is a village and a panchayat in Block -Khutar Shahjahanpur district in the Indian state of Uttar Pradesh..

History
Silhua is a village panchayat located in the Block-khutar District-Shahjahanpur  of State-Uttar Pradesh ,Country-India. The latitude 28.1978903 and longitude 80.2425869 are the geocoordinate of the Silhua. Lucknow is the state capital for Silhua village. It is located around 186.4 kilometer away from Silhua.. The other nearest state capital from Silhua is Delhi and its distance is 350.2 KM. The other surrounding state capitals are Lucknow 175.0 KM., Dehradun 307.8 KM., Chandigarh 439.1 KM.

Nearby villages
The surrounding nearby villages and its distance from Silhua are Pipariya Bhagwant 1.4 KM , Rajmana 2.6 KM , Malika 2.7 KM , Rautapur Kalan 3.0 KM , Itauwa 3.1 KM , Athkona 3.5 KM , Khutar 3.7 KM , Tah Khurd Kalan 4.1 KM , Piparia Birsinghpur 4.2 KM , Raswan Kalan 4.5 KM , Kuiyan 5.1 KM , Nawazpur 5.2 KM , Chamra Bojhi 5.4 KM , Garhia Sareli 5.8 KM , Lakshmipur 6.1 KM , Gurghiya 6.5 KM , Chappa Bojhi 7.3 KM , Muradpur Nibiakhera 7.8 KM , Karhaiyamaichaknk 8.7 KM , Sihura Khurd Kalan 8.8 KM , Saharu Mu. Singhpur 9.1 KM , Todarpur T. Khutar 9.3 KM , Dhansinghpur 11.6 KM , Sarai 11.7 KM , Navadia Nawazpur 13.3 KM , Larti 13.6 KM , Harraipur 13.6 KM , Kolhugarha 15.0 KM , Barhaipur 16.0 KM , Harnahai 16.0 KM , Bela 17.0 KM , Jadhopur Kalan 17.5 KM , Hanshpur 17.6 KM , Navadia Darudgara 17.9 KM , Kamriya , Hariharpur , Khandsar .
The official language of Silhua.

Present Gram Pradhan
Mrs.Shashi Devi W/O Mr.Ram Prakash Mishra

Schools
Sant Binobha Kanya Inter College
Junior High School
Primary School

Temples
Baaban Ganga Sarovar
Madhi
Kameshwar Nath Shiv Temple

Geography
It has an average elevation of 162 metres (531 feet). Dudhwa National Park is 70 km away and Gola_Gokarannath (Chota Kashi) is 25 km away.

Demographics
 India census, silhua had a population of 4,219. Males constitute 53% of the population and females 47%. Silhua has an average literacy rate of 21%, lower than the national average of 59.5%: male literacy is 58%, and female literacy is 19%. In Khutar, 18% of the population is under 6 years of age.

References

Cities and towns in Shahjahanpur district